Hydroxyapatite, also called hydroxylapatite (HA), is a naturally occurring mineral form of calcium apatite with the formula Ca5(PO4)3(OH), but it is usually written Ca10(PO4)6(OH)2 to denote that the crystal unit cell comprises two entities. Hydroxyapatite is the hydroxyl endmember of the complex apatite group. The OH− ion can be replaced by fluoride, chloride or carbonate, producing fluorapatite or chlorapatite. It crystallizes in the hexagonal crystal system. Pure hydroxyapatite powder is white. Naturally occurring apatites can, however, also have brown, yellow, or green colorations, comparable to the discolorations of dental fluorosis.

Up to 50% by volume and 70% by weight of human bone is a modified form of hydroxyapatite, known as bone mineral. Carbonated calcium-deficient hydroxyapatite is the main mineral of which dental enamel and dentin are composed. Hydroxyapatite crystals are also found in pathological calcifications such as those found in breast tumors, as well as calcifications within the pineal gland (and other structures of the brain) known as corpora arenacea or "brain sand".

Chemical synthesis
Hydroxyapatite can be synthesized via several methods, such as wet chemical deposition, biomimetic deposition, sol-gel route  (wet-chemical precipitation) or electrodeposition. The hydroxyapatite nanocrystal suspension can be prepared by a wet chemical precipitation reaction following the reaction equation below:

10 Ca(OH)2 + 6 H3PO4 → Ca10(PO4)6(OH)2 + 18 H2O

The ability to synthetically replicate hydroxyapatite has invaluable clinical implications, especially in dentistry. Each technique yields hydroxyapatite crystals of varied characteristics, such as size and shape. These variations have a marked effect on the biological and mechanical properties of the compound, and therefore these hydroxyapatite products have different clinical uses.

Calcium-deficient hydroxyapatite
Calcium-deficient (non-stochiometric) hydroxyapatite, Ca10−x(PO4)6−x(HPO4)x(OH)2−x (where x is between 0 and 1) has a Ca/P ratio between 1.67 and 1.5.  The Ca/P ratio is often used in the discussion of calcium phosphate phases. Stoichiometric apatite Ca10(PO4)6(OH)2 has a Ca/P ratio of 10:6 normally expressed as 1.67. The non-stoichiometric phases have the hydroxyapatite structure with cation vacancies (Ca2+) and anion (OH−) vacancies. The sites occupied solely by phosphate anions in stoichiometric hydroxyapatite, are occupied by phosphate or hydrogen phosphate, HPO42−, anions.
Preparation of these calcium-deficient phases can be prepared by precipitation from a mixture of calcium nitrate and diammonium phosphate with the desired Ca/P ratio, for example, to make a sample with a Ca/P ratio of 1.6:

9.6 Ca(NO3)2 + 6 (NH4)2HPO4 → Ca9.6(PO4)5.6(HPO4)0.4(OH)1.6

Sintering these non-stoichiometric phases forms a solid phase which is an intimate mixture of tricalcium phosphate and hydroxyapatite, termed biphasic calcium phosphate:

Ca10−x(PO4)6−x(HPO4)x(OH)2−x → (1 − x) Ca10(PO4)6(OH)2 + 3x Ca3(PO4)2

Biological function

Mantis shrimp
The clubbing appendages of the Odontodactylus scyllarus (peacock mantis shrimp) are made of an extremely dense form of the mineral which has a higher specific strength; this has led to its investigation for potential synthesis and engineering use.  Their dactyl appendages have excellent impact resistance due to the impact region being composed of mainly crystalline hydroxyapatite, which offers significant hardness. A periodic layer underneath the impact layer composed of hydroxyapatite with lower calcium and phosphorus content (thus resulting in a much lower modulus) inhibits crack growth by forcing new cracks to change directions. This periodic layer also reduces the energy transferred across both layers due to the large difference in modulus, even reflecting some of the incident energy.

Mammal/human
Hydroxyapatite is present in bone and teeth; bone is made primarily of HA crystals interspersed in a collagen matrix—65 to 70% of the mass of bone is HA.  Similarly HA is 70 to 80% of the mass of dentin and enamel in teeth.  In enamel, the matrix for HA is formed by amelogenins and enamelins instead of collagen.

Hydroxyapatite deposits in tendons around joints results in the medical condition calcific tendinitis.

Hydroxyapatite is a constituent of calcium phosphate kidney stones.

Hydroxyapatite in remineralisation of tooth enamel 
Remineralisation of tooth enamel involves the reintroduction of mineral ions into demineralised enamel. Hydroxyapatite is the main mineral component of enamel in teeth. During demineralisation, calcium and phosphorus ions are drawn out from the hydroxyapatite. The mineral ions introduced during remineralisation restore the structure of the hydroxyapatite crystals. If fluoride ions are present during the remineralisation, through water fluoridation or the use of fluoride-containing toothpaste, the stronger and more acid-resistant fluorapatite crystals are formed instead of the hydroxyapatite crystals.

Use in dentistry
, the use of hydroxyapatite, or its synthetically manufactured form, nano-hydroxyapatite, is not yet common practice. Some studies suggest it is useful in counteracting dentine hypersensitivity, preventing sensitivity after teeth bleaching procedures and caries prevention. Avian eggshell hydroxyapatite  can be a viable filler material in bone regeneration procedures in oral surgery.

Dentine sensitivity 
Nano-hydroxyapatite possesses bioactive components which can prompt the mineralisation process of teeth, remedying hypersensitivity. Hypersensitivity of teeth is thought to be regulated by fluid within dentinal tubules. The movement of this fluid as a result of different stimuli is said to excite receptor cells in the pulp and trigger sensations of pain. The physical properties of the nano-hydroxyapatite can penetrate and seal the tubules, stopping the circulation of the fluid and therefore the sensations of pain from stimuli. Nano-hydroxyapatite would be preferred as it parallels the natural process of surface remineralisation.

In comparison to alternative treatments for dentine hypersensitivity relief, nano-hydroxyapatite containing treatment has been shown to perform better clinically. Nano-hydroxyapatite was proven to be better than other treatments at reducing sensitivity against evaporative stimuli, such as an air blast, and tactile stimuli, such as tapping the tooth with a dental instrument. However, no difference was seen between nano-hydroxyapatite and other treatments for cold stimuli. Hydroxyapatite has shown significant medium and long-term desensitizing effects on dentine hypersensitivity using evaporative stimuli and the visual analogue scale (alongside potassium nitrate, arginine, glutaraldehyde with hydroxyethyl methacrylate, hydroxyapatite, adhesive systems, glass ionomer cements and laser).

Co-agent for bleaching 
Teeth bleaching agents release reactive oxygen species which can degrade enamel. To prevent this, nano-hydroxyapatite can be added to the bleaching solution to reduce the impact of the bleaching agent by blocking pores within the enamel. This reduces sensitivity after the bleaching process.

Caries prevention 
Nano-hydroxyapatite possesses a remineralising effect on teeth and can be used to prevent damage from carious attacks. In the event of an acid attack by cariogenic bacteria, nano-hydroxyapatite particles can infiltrate pores on the tooth surface to form a protective layer. Furthermore, nano-hydroxyapatite may have the capacity to reverse damage from carious assaults by either directly replacing deteriorated surface minerals or acting as a binding agent for lost ions.

In the future, there are possibilities for using nano-hydroxyapatite for tissue engineering and repair. The main and most advantageous feature of nano-hydroxyapatite is its biocompatibility. It is chemically similar to naturally occurring hydroxyapatite and can mimic the structure and biological function of the structures found in the resident extracellular matrix. Therefore, it can be used as a scaffold for engineering tissues such as bone and cementum. It may be used to restore cleft lips and palates and refine existing practices such as preservation of alveolar bone after extraction for better implant placement.

As a dental material 
Hydroxyapatite is widely used within dentistry and oral and maxillofacial surgery, due to its chemical similarity to hard tissue.

In some toothpaste hydroxyapatite can be found in the form of nanocrystals (as these are easily dissolved). In recent years, hydroxyapatite nanocrystals (nHA) have been used in toothpaste to combat dental hypersensitivity. They aid in the repair and remineralisation of the enamel, thus helping to prevent tooth sensitivity. Tooth enamel can become demineralised due to various factors, including acidic erosion and dental caries. If left untreated this can lead to the exposure of dentin and subsequent exposure of the dental pulp. In various studies the use of nano hydroxyapatite in toothpaste showed positive results in aiding the remineralisation of dental enamel.

Synthetic hydroxyapatite (SHA) is proven to provide successful outcomes in alveolar socket preservation. Socket grafting using synthetic hydroxyapatite can result in successful bone regeneration.

Safety concerns 

The European Commission's Scientific Committee on Consumer Safety (SCCS) issued an official opinion in 2021, where it considered whether the nanomaterial hydroxyapatite was safe when used in leave-on and rinse-off dermal and oral cosmetic products, taking into account reasonably foreseeable exposure conditions. It stated:

Chromatography

The mechanism of hydroxyapatite chromatography is complicated and has been described as "mixed-mode". It involves ionic interactions between positively charged groups on a biomolecule (often a protein) and the phosphate groups in hydroxyapatite, and metal chelation between hydroxyapatite calcium ions and negatively charged phosphate and/or carboxyl groups on the biomolecule. It may be difficult to predict the effectiveness of hydroxyapatite chromatography based on physical and chemical properties of the desired protein to be purified. For elution, a buffer with increasing phosphate and/or neutral salt concentration is typically used.

Use in archaeology
In archaeology, hydroxyapatite from human and animal remains can be analysed to reconstruct ancient diets, migrations and paleoclimate. The mineral fractions of bone and teeth act as a reservoir of trace elements, including carbon, oxygen and strontium. Stable isotope analysis of human and faunal hydroxyapatite can be used to indicate whether a diet was predominantly terrestrial or marine in nature (carbon, strontium); the geographical origin and migratory habits of an animal or human (oxygen, strontium) and to reconstruct past temperatures and climate shifts (oxygen). Post-depositional alteration of bone can contribute to the degradation of bone collagen, the protein required for stable isotope analysis.

Defluoridation
Hydroxyapatite is a potential adsorbent for the defluoridation of drinking water, as it forms fluorapatite in a three step process. Hydroxyapatite removes F− from the water to replace OH− forming fluorapatite. However, during the defluoridation process the hydroxyapatite dissolves, and increases the pH and phosphate ion concentration which makes the defluoridated water unfit for drinking. Recently, a ″calcium amended-hydroxyapatite″ defluoridation technique was suggested to overcome the phosphate leaching from hydroxyapatite. This technique can also affect fluorosis reversal by providing calcium-enriched alkaline drinking water to fluorosis affected areas.

See also
 Calcium hydroxyphosphate
 Calcific tendinitis
 Mechanical properties of biomaterials

References

External links

Calcium minerals
Phosphate minerals
Ceramic materials
Biomaterials
Hexagonal minerals
Minerals in space group 176